P. T. Barnum (1810–1891) was an American businessman and circus founder.

Barnum may also refer to:

Places

United States
 Barnum, Iowa, a small city
 Barnum, Minnesota, a small city
 Barnum Township, Carlton County, Minnesota
 Barnum, Texas, an unincorporated community
 Barnum, West Virginia, an unincorporated community
 Barnum, Wisconsin, an unincorporated community

People with the surname
 Gertrude Barnum (1866–1948), American social worker and labor organizer
 H. B. Barnum (born 1936), American songwriter
 Henry A. Barnum (1833–1892), US Civil War general from New York
 Marcus H. Barnum (1834–1904), American politician
 Harvey C. Barnum Jr. (born 1940), retired decorated US Marines officer and namesake of USS Harvey C. Barnum Jr.

Other uses
 Barnum effect, a cognitive bias named after P. T. Barnum
 Barnum (musical), a Broadway musical based on P.T. Barnum's life
 Barnum's American Museum, New York City, US

See also
 Barnham (disambiguation)